Wyoming Highway 352 (WYO 352) is a  north-south Wyoming state road located in northern Sublette County. Highway 352 provides access Cora and Bridger National Forest.

Route description

Wyoming Highway 352 begins its southern end at U.S. Route 191, 5 miles west of Pinedale. Highway 352 travels north, reaching the community (CDP) of Cora at just over 4 miles. Past Cora, WYO 352 begins to parallel the New Fork River, and will do so for approximately 7 miles. CR 149 travels west to US 189/US 191. WYO 352 continues northward as the New Fork River leaves east to the New Fork Lakes, meanwhile the Green River closes in from the west and will be paralleled to the northern terminus. Highway 352 reaches its northern terminus at the entrance Bridger National Forest at 25.31 miles. The roadway continues as Forest Service Road 10091.

Major intersections

See also

References

External links 

 Wyoming State Routes 300-399
 WYO 352 - US 191 to Bridger National Forest

Transportation in Sublette County, Wyoming
352